The 2011–12 season was the 64th season in the existence of FC Steaua București and the club's 64th consecutive season in the top flight of Romanian football. In addition to the domestic league, Steaua București participated in this season's edition of the Cupa României, the Supercupa României and the UEFA Europa League.

Previous season positions

Players

Squad information

|-
|colspan="12"|Players from YS
|-

|-
|colspan="12"|Players sold or loaned out during the season
|-

Transfers

In

Out

Statistics

Player stats

|-
|colspan="17"|Players from YS
|-

|-
|colspan="17"|Players sold or loaned out during the season
|-

  Petrolul–Steaua match awarded to Steaua 0–3 after it was suspended in the 45+10 minute at the score of 0–2 for incidents with Petrolul supporters, the two goals scored of Bicfalvi and Mihai Costea goals was annulated.

Goalscorers

  Petrolul–Steaua match awarded to Steaua 0–3 after it was suspended in the 45+10 minute at the score of 0–2 for incidents with Petrolul supporters, the two goals scored of Bicfalvi and Mihai Costea goals was annulated.

Goal minutes

Last updated:20 May 2012 (UTC) 
Source: FCSB 

  Petrolul–Steaua match awarded to Steaua 0–3 after it was suspended in the 45+10 minute at the score of 0–2 for incidents with Petrolul supporters, the two goals scored of Bicfalvi and Mihai Costea goals was annulated.

Starting XI

Squad stats
{|class="wikitable" style="text-align: center;"
|-
!
!Total
!Home
!Away
!Neutral
|-
|align=left| Games played ||47 ||23 ||23 || 1
|-
|align=left| Games won    ||23 ||16 || 7 || 0
|-
|align=left| Games drawn  ||12 || 4 || 8 || 0
|-
|align=left| Games lost   ||12 || 3 || 8 || 1
|-
|align=left| Biggest win  || 4–0 vs CS Mioveni4–0 vs Sănătatea Cluj || 4–0 vs CS Mioveni4–0 vs Sănătatea Cluj || 3–0 vs Petrolul Ploiești || —
|-
|align=left| Biggest lose || 5–0 vs Maccabi Haifa || 2–1 vs Pandurii Târgu Jiu1–0 vs Twente1–0 vs FC Vaslui || 5–0 vs Maccabi Haifa || 1–0 vs Oțelul Galați
|-
|align=left| Clean sheets    ||16 ||10 ||  6 || 0
|-
|align=left| Goals scored    ||63 ||41 || 22 || 0
|-
|align=left| Goals conceded  ||43 ||16 || 26 || 1
|-
|align=left| Goal difference ||+20||+25|| -4 ||-1
|-
|align=left| Top scorer      || Rusescu (15) || 9 || 6 ||  0
|-
|align=left| Winning rate    || % || % || % || %

  Match awarded to Steaua 0–3 after it was suspended in the 45+10 minute at the score of 0–2 for incidents with Petrolul supporters, the two goals scored of Bicfalvi and Mihai Costea goals was annulated.

International appearances

Competitions

Overall

Supercupa României

Results

Liga I

League table

Results summary

Results by round

Points by opponent

Source: FCSB 

  Match awarded to Steaua 0–3 after it was suspended in the 45+10 minute at the score of 0–2 for incidents with Petrolul supporters, the two goals scored of Bicfalvi and Mihai Costea goals was annulated.

Matches

Cupa României

Results

UEFA Europa League

Play-off round

Group stage

Results

Round of 32

Non competitive matches

UEFA Club rankings
This is the current UEFA Club Rankings, including season 2010–11.

Notes and references

2011-12
Steaua Bucuresti season
Steaua Bucuresti